Asgarabad (also Romanized as ‘Asgarābād) is a village in Fazl Rural District, Zarrin Dasht District, Nahavand County, Hamadan Province, Iran. At the 2006 census, its population was 546, in 124 families.

References 

Populated places in Nahavand County